McChrystal Group LLC is an advisory services, management consulting, and leadership development firm. It was founded in 2011 by Stanley McChrystal, a retired United States Army four-star general best known for his command of Joint Special Operations Command (JSOC) in the mid-2000s. 

According to the company website, the company offers advisory services, leadership institute, and diagnostic assessments. The firm serves a diverse client pool representing a wide range of industries. The firm specializes in serving the healthcare, consumer goods, construction, technology, financial services, and energy and resources industries.

History

The McChrystal Group was founded in 2011 by Stanley McChrystal. After his departure from the military in 2010, McChrystal and like-minded colleagues explored how they could capture the lessons they learned in counterterrorism and translate them into the private sector, based on the premise that businesses today are experiencing parallels to what McChrystal and his colleagues faced in the war theater. The firm grew over the years, adding academic experts and business practitioners, expanding offerings, and taking on new clients in different industries.

Organization

The McChrystal Group has two offices. Its headquarters are located in Alexandria, Virginia. The firm also has an office in London.

References

American companies established in 2011
International management consulting firms
Privately held companies based in Virginia